Enrico Dandolo or simply Dandolo was the name of at least three ships of the Italian Navy named in honour of Enrico Dandolo and may refer to:

  was an ironclad warship launched in 1878 and stricken in 1920.
 , a  launched in 1937 and discarded in 1947.
 , an unbuilt 
 , a  launched in 1967 and decommissioned in 1993.

Italian Navy ship names